George Frederick Smeaton (27 May 1917 – 9 June 1978) was an Australian rules footballer who played for the Richmond Football Club in the Victorian Football League (VFL) between 1935 and 1942 and then again from 1944 to 1946.

Smeaton was nicknamed the "Brown Bomber", a nickname borrowed from Joe Louis, and was described by Jack Dyer as the toughest player he played with.

He left Richmond in 1947 to take up a coaching position with Latrobe in Northern Tasmania.

He later returned to Victoria and had a successful coaching career in the Victorian Football Association (VFA) where he led Oakleigh to three Grand Finals, winning premierships in 1950 and 1952 and losing the 1949 Grand Final due to a late goal by Williamstown.

He was also an established cricketer, captaining the Victorian school boys cricket team.

External links

George Smeaton's playing statistics from The VFA Project

Notes

References
 Hogan P: The Tigers of Old, Richmond FC, Melbourne 1996
 Fiddian, Marc: Devils at Play. A History of the Oakleigh Football Club, Pakenham Gazette, Pakenham 1982

1917 births
1978 deaths
People from Carlton, Victoria
Australian rules footballers from Melbourne
Richmond Football Club players
Oakleigh Football Club players
Oakleigh Football Club coaches
Latrobe Football Club players